Trichomorpha esulcata is a species of millipede in the family Chelodesmidae that can be found in San Vito, Costa Rica, where it was found on 17–18 April 1972.

Description
The body is brownish in color but uncolored on the outer antennae joints, legs, posterior of keel, and ventral surfaces.

References

Polydesmida
Animals described in 1975
Endemic fauna of Costa Rica
Millipedes of Central America